Shakar Khan Shakar ( 3 September 1940) he is a retired Afghanistan wrestler, who competed at the 1964 Summer Olympic Games and the 1972 Summer Olympic Games in the welterweight events.

References

Wrestlers at the 1964 Summer Olympics
Wrestlers at the 1972 Summer Olympics
Afghan male sport wrestlers
Olympic wrestlers of Afghanistan
Wrestlers at the 1966 Asian Games
1940 births
Living people
Asian Games competitors for Afghanistan